Jeffrey Mayes (born April 26, 1971) is a Democratic politician from the U.S. state of Michigan. He is the immediate past representative the 96th House district, based in Bay City, and includes the bottom half of Bay County. While in the House, he chaired the Agriculture Committee.

Early life
Mayes graduated from T. L. Handy High School in 1990 and received a Bachelor of Arts Degree in Political Science in 1994 from the University of Michigan, where he was an Evans Scholar. He served as an aid to state representatives Howard Wetters and Joseph Rivet before being himself elected to the State House in 2004. He is a Roman Catholic and lives in Bay City.

Political career
He served as Supervisor of the Charter Township of Bangor from 2000 to 2004. Mayes was elected to the House in 2004 to replace Democrat Joseph Rivet, who retired due to term limits. He represents the 96th district, which is heavily Democratic. Mayes was easily re-elected in 2006. In 2006, he was appointed chairman of the Agriculture Committee, which deals with all agriculture and farming related issues in Michigan. He is also an Eagle Scout through Troop 108 of Bay City, Michigan.

External links

Living people
Democratic Party members of the Michigan House of Representatives
1971 births
Catholics from Michigan
University of Michigan alumni
21st-century American politicians